The Arabic Wikipedia is the Modern Standard Arabic version of Wikipedia. It started on 9 July 2003. It was the first Wikipedia in a Semitic language to exceed 100,000 articles on 25 May 2009, and also the first Semitic language to exceed 1 million articles, on 17 November 2019.

The design of the Arabic Wikipedia differs somewhat from other Wikipedias. Most notably, since Arabic is written right-to-left, the location of links is a mirror image of those Wikipedias in languages written left-to-right. Before Wikipedia was updated to MediaWiki 1.16, Arabic Wikipedia had a default page background of the site inspired by Arabic/Islamic tiling or ornament styles. Switching from MediaWiki's new default Vector layout to the original MonoBook layout may restore this page background.

Three varieties of Arabic have their own Wikipedia: Standard, Egyptian, and Moroccan. Additionally, Maltese, derived from Arabic, has its own Wikipedia.

History 

At the emergence of the Wikipedia project in 2001, there were calls to create an Arabic domain raised by Arab engineers. The domain was created as "ar.wikipedia.org" but no serious activity took place except with anonymous users who experimented with the idea. Until 7 February 2003, all contributors to the Arabic Wikipedia were non-Arab volunteers from the International Project Wikipedia that handled the technical aspects. Elizabeth Bauer, who used the user name Elian in the Arabic Wikipedia, approached many Arabic speakers who potentially might be interested in volunteering to spearhead the Arabic project. The only group who responded was the ArabEyes team who were involved in Arabizing the Open Source initiatives. Elian's request was conservatively received and the ArabEyes team was ready to participate but not take a leadership role and then declined to participate on the second of February 2003. During this negotiation time, volunteer users from the German Wikipedia project continued to develop the technical infrastructure of the Arabic Wikipedia backbone.

In 2003 Rami Tarawneh, a Jordanian PhD student in Germany who originated from Zarqa, encountered the English Wikipedia and began to edit content. Contributors encouraged him to start an Arabic Wikipedia. The Arabic Wikipedia opened in July 2003. By that year a significant group of contributors included Tarawneh and four other Jordanians studying in Germany.

On 7 February 2004, one member from the ArabEyes, Isam Bayazidi, volunteered with 4 other friends to be involved with the Arabic Wikipedia and assumed some leadership roles. In 2004, Bayazid was assigned the SysOp responsibilities and he, with another 5 volunteers, namely Ayman, Abo Suleiman, Mustapha Ahmad and Bassem Jarkas are considered to be the first Arabs to lead the Wikipedia project and they are attributed for working on translating and enforcing the English policies to Arabic. The Arabic Wikipedia faced many challenges at its inception. In February 2004, it was considered to be the worst Wikipedia project among all other languages. However, in 2005, it showed phenomenal progress  by which in December 2005, the total number of articles reached 8,285. By that time, there were fewer than 20 contributors and the administrators and contributors made efforts to recruit new users.

In 2007 the secret police in an unspecified country detained Tarawneh and demanded that he reveal the IP address of a contributor. To protect the Wikipedian, the administrators forged a dispute that was the presumed reason for Tarawneh losing his administrator access, so the secret police was unable to obtain the IP. In response to the incident, the rules now state that no one user may have access to all information about the Wikipedia's users.

In 2008 the Wikipedia had had fewer than 65,000 articles and was ranked No. 29 out of the Wikipedias, behind the Esperanto Wikipedia and the Slovenian Wikipedia. Noam Cohen of The New York Times reported that, to many of the attendees of the 2008 Wikimania conference in Alexandria, Egypt, the "woeful shape of the Arabic Wikipedia has been the cause of chagrin." Cohen stated that out of Egyptians, fewer than 10% "are thought to have internet access" and of those with internet access many tend to be knowledgeable in English and have a preference of communicating in that language. The Arabic Wikipedia had 118,870 articles as of 15 January 2010.

As of July 2012 there are around 630 active Arabic Wikipedia editors around the world. Ikram Al-Yacoub of Al Arabiya says that this is "a relatively low figure." At the time there were hundreds of thousands of Wikipedia articles on the Arabic Wikipedia. The Wikimedia Foundation and the nonprofit group Taghreedat established the "Arabic Wikipedia Editors Program" intended to train users to edit the Arabic Wikipedia. By the end of June 2014, the number of articles had reached 384,000

Iraqi volunteers have translated much of English Wikipedia into Arabic Wikipedia. More recently, a project named Bayt Alhikma has translated more than 10,000 articles about science and other topics in Arabic. The number of active users in Arabic Wikipedia is increasing quickly, reaching the 10,000 mark for first time on 10 February 2021.

Evaluation and criticism 

In June 2016, Arabic Wikipedia scored 233 in terms of depth (a very rough indicator of the encyclopedia's quality). This is better than the German version (102), the French version (207) or the Japanese version (74), making it the fifth highest +100,000 articles Wikipedia in the terms of depth, after English Wikipedia (930), Serbo-Croatian Wikipedia (561), Thai Wikipedia (253) and Hebrew Wikipedia (251).

At Wikimania 2008, Jimmy Wales argued that high-profile arrests like those of Egyptian blogger Kareem Amer could be hampering the development of the Arabic Wikipedia by making editors afraid to contribute.

In 2010, Tarek Al Kaziri, from Radio Netherlands Worldwide, believed that the Arabic Wikipedia reflected the Arabic reality in general. Low participation lowers the probability that the articles are reviewed, developed and updated, and political polarisation of participants is likely to lead to biases in the articles.

According to Alexa Internet, on 26 November 2014, the Arabic Wikipedia is the 10th most visited language version of Wikipedia in terms of percentage of visitors on all of the Wikipedias over a month, with the "ar.wikipedia.org" subdomain attracting approximately 1.8% of the total visitors of the "wikipedia.org" website, despite being ranked no. 22 in term of the article count. In terms of page views, it is ranked 12th with the same 10 Wikipedias above it plus the Polish and Dutch ones.

In mid-2020, Arabic Wikipedia was criticized for deletion of the article about Sarah Hegazi. Some Arabic LGBT activists on social media accused Arabic Wikipedia of bias against the Arab LGBT community, and considered the action to be part of censorship, hate-speech and homophobia in Middle East. The news website Raseef22 criticized Arabic Wikipedia's policies, and said that the project was controlled by prejudiced administrators who reject articles about minorities and women.

Censorship

Saudi Arabia

Syria

Usage and page views by country 

Florence Devouard, the former president of the Wikimedia Foundation, stated in 2010 that the largest number of articles on the Arabic Wikipedia were written by Egyptians and that the Egyptians were more likely to participate in the Arabic Wikipedia compared to other groups.

Generally, Arabic Wikipedia, as of 2018, is the most popular language version of Wikipedia in the most Arabic countries, except Tunisia, Comoros, Chad, Lebanon, Qatar, Bahrain and the UAE. Arabic Wikipedia has its highest percentages in Egypt, Libya and the countries of the Levant (except Israel and Lebanon) and the Arabic peninsula. This discrepancy happens because of the deficits of Wikipedia in Arabic regarding quality and quantity, while in the latter three the lead of English there is associated with the fact that most residents there are migrants from various countries, such as India, Bangladesh, Pakistan, Sri Lanka, Philippines and other countries, where English is the most popular language there. 

As of December 2022, Arabic receives around to 180 to 260 million pageviews per month, depending on the season. The most pageviews are recorded in winter and spring.

Also, the Ideas Beyond Borders project, in cooperation with the I Believe in Science website, launched the Bayt Alhikma 2.0 project in December 2018 in order to translate science-related articles in Arabic.

See also 
 Egyptian Arabic Wikipedia
 Moroccan Arabic Wikipedia

References

External links 

  Arabic Wikipedia
  Arabic Wikipedia mobile version
 
 

Arabic-language encyclopedias
Arabic-language websites
Science and technology in the Arab world
Wikipedias by language
Internet properties established in 2003